The World We Live In and Live in Hamburg is the first video release by Depeche Mode, featuring almost an entire concert from their 1984 Some Great Reward Tour, at the Alsterdorfer Sporthalle in Hamburg, Germany on 9th December 1984. It was directed by Clive Richardson. The name is a play on a lyric of the song "Somebody" (She will listen to me, when I want to speak about the world we live in and life in general...).

The number of songs on the video depends on the region. Some have eleven, some have seventeen. The seventeen-song version was re-released in 1999, though still on VHS, in Europe only and in Japan on other formats. The United States only has the 11-song version.

Two songs that were performed during the Hamburg concert, "Puppets" and "Ice Machine" (both written by ex-member Vince Clarke), have yet to appear on any format. It is unclear why these were omitted from the original release.

Track list 
UK Official Releases
VVD063 (Virgin VHS video) – 1985 (the original release)
VVD063 (Virgin BETAMAX video) – 1985
MF021 (Mute Film VHS video) – 1999 (reissue)
Japan Official Releases
SM068-3005 (Virgin Laser Disc video) – 1985
VBM-81 (Virgin BETAMAX video) – 1985

All tracks appear on all UK and Japanese releases.

 "Something to Do"
 "Two Minute Warning"
 "If You Want"
 "People Are People"
 "Leave in Silence"
 "New Life"
 "Shame"
 "Somebody"
 "Lie to Me"
 "Blasphemous Rumours"
 "Told You So"
 "Master and Servant"
 "Photographic"
 "Everything Counts"
 "See You"
 "Shout!"
 "Just Can't Get Enough"

USA Official Releases
38107-3 (Sire VHS video)
38107-6 (Sire Laser Disc video)

 "Something to Do"
 "If You Want"
 "People Are People"
 "Somebody"
 "Lie to Me"
 "Blasphemous Rumours"
 "Told You So"
 "Master and Servant"
 "Photographic"
 "Everything Counts"
 "Just Can't Get Enough"

 "Photographic" was later included on the music video compilation Some Great Videos.
All songs are written by Martin Gore except "Two Minute Warning" and "If You Want" which were written by Alan Wilder. "New Life", "Photographic", "Shout!", and "Just Can't Get Enough" were written by Vince Clarke.

Personnel
Dave Gahan – lead vocals
Martin Gore – keyboards, melodica, recorder, percussion pad, metal pipes, lead and backing vocals
Alan Wilder – keyboards, piano, percussion pad, corrugated iron, backing vocals
Andy Fletcher – keyboards, percussion pad, bikewheel, backing vocals

References

External links

 

Depeche Mode video albums
Culture in Hamburg
1985 video albums
Live video albums
1985 live albums